Morskoy Municipal Okrug is a municipal okrug in Vasileostrovsky District, one of the eighty-one low-level municipal divisions  of the federal city of St. Petersburg, Russia. As of the 2010 Census, its population was 34,885, up from 31,555 recorded during the 2002 Census.

References

Notes

Sources

Vasileostrovsky District